Daegu National University of Education, commonly abbreviated as Daegu-gyodae (대구교대) in Korean, is one of the National Universities of Education which provides training courses for preliminary teachers in the public primary schools of South Korea.

Founded in 1950, DNUE was previously called Daegu Normal School. Its first president was Kim Young-gi (김영기, 金永驥). In 1963, it was renamed Daegu Gyoyuk Dae. It concentrated on primary school education, not including secondary school courses. Its most recent name change was in 1993, when the school adopted the name it uses today. Nam Seung-in (남승인) has been its president since 2011. About 85 instructors are employed by the university.

History

Daegu National University of Education (DNUE) opened as Daegu Normal School in 1950, though its origins can be traced back to 1923, when Daegu Sabeom Haggyo (大邱師範學敎, 大邱师范学校) was established by the Japanese Government-General of Korea for training school instructors.

The university has always been under national control. It officially began as Daegu Normal School (대구사범학교) in 1950. In 1962, it was briefly attached to Kyungpook National University as a two-year college, but the institutions were separated again the following year.  It became a four-year college in 1982 and a university in 1993.  The graduate school was established in November 1995.

The university has had various name changes to gratify social needs.

Pre-established 

The university was known as Daegu Sabeom Haggyo from 1923 to 1946, with some variations.
 Gonglib Daegu Sabeom Haggyo (公立大邱師範學敎, 공립대구사범학교) (1923–1929) – established by the government, but operated by the local government
 Guanlib Daegu Sabeom Haggyo (官立大邱師範學敎, 관립대구사범학교) (1929–1944) – operated by the government
 Daegu Sabeom Haggyo (大邱師範學敎, 대구사범학교) (1944) – considered a special college

The name was changed to Daegu Normal University when two similar schools were merged.
 Daegu Sabeom Daehak (大邱師範大學, 대구사범대학) (1946) – considered a college of Kyungpook National University
 Dolib Gyeongsangbuk-do Chodeung-gyowon Yangseongso (道立慶尙北道初等敎員養成所, 도립경상북도초등교원양성소) (established in 1949) – a training school for elementary school teachers operated by the Gyeongsangbuk-do government

Establishment 
The school has been known as Daegu National University of Education since 1950.
 Daegu Gonglib Sabeom Haggyo (大邱公立師範學敎, 대구공립사범학교) (1950) – Dolib Gyeongsangbuk-do Chodeung-gyowon Yangseongso was merged with Daegu Sabeom Daehak, commonly called Daegu Normal University
 Educational College was annexed by Kyungpook National University (慶北大學校竝設敎育大學, 경북대학교병설교육대학) (1962) with Gim-wiseog as the college principal, 김위석(金渭錫) – two-year college
 Daegu National College of Education (大邱敎育大學, 대구교육대학) (1963) – split with Kyungpook National University
 Daegu National College of Education (大邱敎育大學, 대구교육대학) (1982) – four-year college
 Daegu National University of Education (大邱敎育大學校, 대구교육대학교) (1998) – four-year university, changed to current name

Academics

Undergraduate course 
As with South Korea's other universities of education, due to the school's special purpose of training primary-school teachers, DNUE has just one major, "elementary education". However, it has opened twelve special courses for students. The undergraduate courses of study at DNUE are divided between general education and specific training in teaching. Completing a thesis is also required for graduation. Specialized teaching degrees are available in each of the teaching fields which are required in the country's public schools.

The school is made up of several departments, which are:

 Department of Ethics Education
 Department of Korean Language Education
 Department of Social Studies Education.
 Department of Mathematics Education
 Department of Science Education
 Department of Physical Education
 Department of Music Education
 Department of Practical Arts Education
 Department of Education (It is focusing on Elementary Education)
 Department of English Education
 Department of Computer Education
 Department of Special & Compositive Education

Graduate school 

At the graduate level, DNUE's Graduate School focuses on training high quality talented elementary school teachers. The university offers courses of advanced study in the following fields:

 Ethical Personality Education
 Elementary Korean Language Education
 Elementary Social Studies Education
 Elementary Mathematics Education
 Elementary Science Education
 Elementary Physical Education
 Elementary Music Education
 Elementary Fine Arts Education
 Elementary Practical Arts Environment Education
 Elementary Educational Administration
 Education Curriculum and Teaching
 Elementary English Education
 Elementary Special Education (designated for the handicapped students)
 Elementary Computer Education
 Preschool and Infant Education (Early childhood education)
 Educational Technology
 Elementary Counseling Education
 Elementary Educational Thought
 Gifted And Talented Education (Normally called 'GATE', special education for the gifted)
 Modeling Creation Education
 Children Literature Education
 School Psychology
 TESLOL-YL
 Children Sport Education
 School Psychology
 Multicultural Education
 Children Invention Education
 Substantive Scientific Experiment Education

Campus 

DNUE consists of the main campus, the Education Research and Training Institute, and two attached schools. The main campus is made up of nine buildings, including a women's dormitory. There is a men's dormitory on the main campus, located in An-ji-rang station with DNUE's Research and Training Institute.

Main campus location 
The main campus is located in Nam-gu, Daegu, South Korea. The main campus is situated in the core part of the city of Dae-gu and was finally rooted in 1953. There are many coffee shops, restaurants, bars, and hotels within ten minutes of the campus. A Korean traditional market (called Yong-seun market 영선 시장), the medical center of Yeong-nam University, Kyungpook Art High school and two other universities are very close neighbors of DNUE. It also has its own subway station called Gyo Dae (교대), which means 'Educational University' in the Korean language.

Attached schools include the Daegu National University of Education Attached Elementary School and Andongbuseol Elementary School.

Public transit access 

 The main campus is served by the National University of Education Station of Daegu Subway Line 1. The subway is the easiest way to come to the campus.
 Airport buses Express 1 and 401 connect the main campus with Daegu International Airport (both the Express 1 and 401 buses are required transferring at the Jungangno station in Daegu Subway Line 1).
 Various Daegu buses stop by the front gate of the university, including 349, 405, 410, 410–1, 503, 649, and 805.

Facilities

Campus 
Campus facilities include two lecture halls (gangyidong 강의동), a large playground, two libraries, one science laboratory, the main office, a music lecture hall, an art hall, two gyms (one large and one smaller), a concert hall (called munhwagwan, 문화관), the student union and cafeteria, a community center, a women's dormitory building, a greenhouse for practical arts education, the security office, two parks, a wooden pavilion, two tennis courts, two volleyball courts, two basketball courts, and a monument with a carving of the university's motto (usually called dong-ddaeng 동땡 by university students).

Library 
The DNUE main campus library is fully equipped for helping students by supplying an Educational History Hall, a computerized education reference room, and free meeting rooms. Furthermore, it recently opened a Facebook page to more freely communicate with students and hear their opinions.

Student life and activities

Student life 
Student life at DNUE differs from many other universities in South Korea. Because the university has a specific purpose, it imposes a considerably stricter curriculum on students. When compared to other universities, there is a significantly less amount of choice in course selection. Students in DNUE all take similar courses, though not identical.

Student activities 
The university offers multiple school activities. These are divided into three categories: Club, Festival, and Occasional activities.

Clubs 
 Studying and volunteer service:
 Hanmalgeul (한말글, researching the Korean language)
 Yeongrokhoe (영록회, studying about educational activities)
 Ssiddongmu (씨동무, studying and volunteer service)
 Green school, green teacher (초록학교 초록교사, environmental education about children)
 TIME (studying English)
 Small Jjaijib (작은 짜이집, international volunteer activities)
 Multicultural Dasom (다문화 다솜, studying about multicultural society in education)
 Exhibition:
 SangRok Literature Club (상록문학회, a literary society especially in poetry)
 Cannes (칸느, movie)
 Geulbal (글발, calligraphy) 
 Hwasahoe (화사회, photography)
 Jeni (제니, animation)
 Religion:
 CCC (Korea Campus Crusade for Christ, 韓國大學生宣敎會)
 IVF (Korea Inter-Varsity Christian Fellowship, 韓國基督學生會)
 SFC (Student For Christ)
 SU (Seongseo Union for Christ)
 Neongkul (넝쿨, meaning "vine"; Catholic club)
 Balamil (바라밀, meaning "paramita"; Buddhism club)
 Performance: 
 Purimadang (푸리마당, a Korean traditional percussion band)
 A dramatic art research group (극예술연구회), Siselpapi (시셀파피, acoustic guitar)
 Evergreen (에버그린, a rock band)
 DNUE's orchestra group, Eoullim (어울림, traditional Korean orchestral music club)
 Harmony (a choir)
 Bi (비, Dance)
 Sports:
 Baekgu (백구, tennis)
 Jeoktoma (적토마, football)
 Subyeokta (수벽타, taekwondo)
 Daseot (다섯, meaning "five"; basketball club)
 Attack line (volleyball)
 Hit & Run (baseball)
 Aisarang Suyeongsarang (아이사랑 수영사랑, "love children and like swimming")
 Union Clubs and Provisional Clubs:
 SeuWing
 RCY
 Unipeace
CMI
Hwabaekhoe-ui (화백회의, history research)
 Other:
Daegu National University of Education Broadcasting System

Festival 
A festival called Daedongke (대동제, 大同祭) is celebrated each year. A Children's Day Festival (every year on May 5) is also celebrated, commonly operated with local children and university students.

Occasional activities 
Each department has their own unique occasional parties and meetings.

President 
The following table is a list of presidents of Daegu National University of Education.

See also
List of national universities in South Korea
List of universities and colleges in South Korea
Education in Korea

References
 https://terms.naver.com/entry.naver?docId=534720&mobile&cid=46615&categoryId=46615#TABLE_OF_CONTENT2
 https://terms.naver.com/entry.naver?docId=1080528&mobile&cid=40942&categoryId=34669
 https://terms.naver.com/entry.naver?docId=658434&mobile&cid=46615&categoryId=46615

External links
Official school website, in English

Universities and colleges in Daegu
National universities of education in South Korea
1950 establishments in South Korea
Educational institutions established in 1950